Tannaz is a feminine given name of Persian origins.

People with this name include:

 Tannaz Farsi (born 1974), Iranian-born American visual artist and teacher
 Tannaz Irani (born 1971), Indian actress
 Tannaz Tabatabaei (born 1983), Iranian actress

Persian feminine given names